Big Band Record is an album by trombonist Ray Anderson and the George Gruntz Concert Jazz Band which was released on the Gramavision label in 1994.

Reception

The Allmusic review by Scott Yanow stated "The often riotous trombonist is fortunate to have his complex but always lively music interpreted by quite an all-star group and Gruntz's arrangements give each musician at least one opportunity to solo. ... it is little surprise that this was one of the top jazz albums released in 1994".

Track listing
All compositions by Ray Anderson except where noted
 "Lips Apart" – 9:57
 "Anabel at One" – 13:20
 "My Wish" – 6:05
 "Raven-a-Ning" – 4:28
 "Leo's Place" – 8:03
 "Seven Monsters" – 10:40
 "Waltz for Phoebe" – 5:13
 "The Literary Lizard" – 9:53
 "Don't Mow Your Lawn" (Ray Anderson, Jackie Raven) – 8:34

Personnel
Ray Anderson – trombone
George Gruntz – piano
Lew Soloff – trumpet
Ryan Kisor – trumpet
John D'earth – trumpet
Herb Robertson – trumpet
Art Baron – trombone
Dave Bargeron – trombone
Dave Taylor – bass trombone
Howard Johnson – tuba, baritone saxophone
Tim Berne – alto saxophone
Marty Ehrlich – alto saxophone, clarinet, soprano saxophone, bass clarinet
Ellery Eskelin – tenor saxophone
Sal Giorgianni – tenor saxophone
Larry Schneider – tenor saxophone
Mark Feldman – violin
Drew Gress – bass
Tom Rainey – drums

References

Ray Anderson (musician) albums
George Gruntz albums
1994 albums
Gramavision Records albums